Song of Naples is a 1957 Italian-German melodrama film written and directed  by Carlo Campogalliani and starring Joachim Fuchsberger and Janet Vidor. It grossed over 202 million lire at the Italian box office.

Plot

Cast
 
 Joachim Fuchsberger as Max 
 Janet Vidor as  Giulia
 Franco Silva as Franco 
 Nino Milano  as Oreste 
 Laya Raki  as Carmen (credited as Laja Raky) 
 Peter Carsten  as Ercole 
 Luciano Tajoli 	 as Luciano 
 Nerio Bernardi 	   
 Anna Campori 	 	 
 Erminio Spalla 	 
 Renato Chiantoni

References

External links

Italian drama films
1957 drama films
1957 films
Films directed by Carlo Campogalliani
West German films
German drama films
Films set in Naples
Melodrama films
Italian black-and-white films
1950s Italian films
1950s German films
1950s Italian-language films